Robert Lee Parish (born August 30, 1953) is an American former professional basketball player who played 21 seasons as a center in the National Basketball Association (NBA), tied for second most in league history. He played an NBA-record 1,611 games in his career. Parish was known for his strong defense, high arcing jump shots, and clutch rebounding late in games.

During his college career at Centenary College, he racked up impressive enough numbers to be drafted three times, twice by teams from the ABA, and finally in 1976 by the Golden State Warriors of the NBA, for whom he played four seasons as the highlight of an otherwise lackluster team. The Boston Celtics needed a new center following the retirement of Dave Cowens, and organized a trade with the Warriors for Parish and a draft pick that they would use to select forward Kevin McHale. The two would join young star forward Larry Bird on the Celtics, forming what is often considered the greatest frontcourt in NBA history, appearing together in five NBA finals and winning three championships over seven seasons during the 1980s. After the retirement of Bird in 1992, and McHale in 1993, Parish remained with the Celtics through the lean years of the early 1990s, leaving the team as a free agent following the 1993–1994 season. He would go on to play two more seasons with the Charlotte Hornets and one more with the Chicago Bulls, winning an NBA championship with the Bulls during the 1996–1997 season, becoming the oldest player to win a championship at the age of 43.  He retired after that season with the most games played of any NBA player with 1611 games, a record that still stands.

Elected to the Basketball Hall of Fame in 2003, Parish was also named to the NBA's 50th and 75th anniversary teams. His nickname was "the Chief", after the fictitious Chief Bromden, a silent, giant Native American character in the film One Flew Over the Cuckoo's Nest. According to Parish, former Celtics forward Cedric Maxwell gave him this nickname because of his stoic nature.

Early life 
Robert is the son of Robert Sr. and Ada Parish. He is the oldest of their four children.

Coleman would come to the Parish family home if Robert missed a practice and gave Parish a basketball to practice with. It was at this time that Parish started wearing his uniform No. 00; on the day they passed out the uniforms in junior high school, it was the only jersey left.

“I really didn’t like basketball growing up.” Parish said, talking about how he focused instead on football, baseball, and track. “[Coach] Coleman would come to my house and take me to practice every day until I had to start showing up myself; I give all the credit to him.”

Parish attended Woodlawn High School in Shreveport, Louisiana, where he played for Coach Ken Ivy. He had previously attended Union High School until it was closed due to desegregation. Named All-American, All-State, All-District, and All-City in 1972, Parish led Woodlawn High School to the 1972 Louisiana High School Athletic Association Class AAAA state championship.

College career 

Parish attended Centenary College of Louisiana, playing for Coach Larry Little, from 1972–1976, choosing the school because it was close to his home. However, he received virtually no notice because of one of the most severe penalties ever levied by the National Collegiate Athletic Association.

"The reason why I chose Centenary is because of their coaches," Parish said. "I was very impressed with the coaches."

In 1965, the NCAA adopted the so-called "1.6 rule" to determine academic eligibility of incoming freshmen. Under its provisions, freshmen academically qualified if their high school grades and standardized test scores predicted a minimum college grade point average of 1.6 on a 4-point scale.

Parish, who led Woodlawn High School in Shreveport to the Louisiana High School Athletic Association Class AAAA state championship in 1972, took a standardized test that did not fit the NCAA's formula; Centenary converted his score to an equivalent that fit the formula, which it had done for 12 other athletes in the previous two years. This was a violation of NCAA regulations; however, the NCAA had not paid any attention to the school's actions before Parish's recruitment.

Shortly before Parish was to enroll, the NCAA notified Centenary that he and four other basketball players whose test scores had been converted were ineligible to play there, but said that the school would not be subject to penalty if it rescinded the five scholarships. Centenary argued that the rule did not say that the school could not convert the scores of Parish and the other players, while the NCAA argued that Centenary could not use the test taken by Parish and the other players to establish eligibility.

When Centenary refused to pull the scholarships, the NCAA issued one of the most draconian sanctions in its history. The school's basketball program was put on probation for six years, during which time it was not only barred from postseason play, but its results and statistics were excluded from weekly statistics and its existence was not acknowledged in the NCAA's annual press guides.

Within days of its decision, the NCAA repealed the 1.6 rule—but refused to make the five players eligible. A few months later, all five, including Parish, sued the NCAA for their eligibility at Centenary, but lost. The decision made Parish a sort of "invisible man" who racked up huge statistical totals in virtual obscurity. In his four years at Centenary, the Gents went 87-21 and spent 14 weeks in the AP Top 20 poll, mostly during his senior season in 1975–76. While he averaged 21.6 points and 16.9 rebounds per game during his Centenary career and Centenary recognized his records, the NCAA would not include Parish's statistics in its record books.

Team USA 1975 
Between his junior and senior years, Parish played for Team USA at the 1975 Pan American Games. His difficulties with the NCAA indirectly led to his not being recommended for a spot on the team. Centenary paid his way to Salt Lake City to try out; he made the team, was unanimously elected captain, and led the team to a gold medal.

College legacy 
Throughout his time at Centenary, Parish chose not to escape anonymity by either jumping to the National Basketball Association or American Basketball Association (the latter of which existed until the ABA–NBA merger in 1976), or by transferring to another college, even though the professional ranks offered him potential riches and a transfer would have given him eligibility and far more publicity. At the time, professional scouts did not question his physical skills, but were divided as to whether his decision to stay at Centenary was a show of loyalty or evidence of poor decision-making. For his part, Parish said, "I didn't transfer because Centenary did nothing wrong. And I have no regrets. None."

Overall, Parish averaged 21.6 points and 16.9 rebounds in his 108-game career at Centenary and 24.8 points and 18 rebounds as a senior. The Sporting News named him a first-team All-American as a senior.

In 2018, the NCAA announced that Parish's records would be recognized and placed into the NCAA Record Book after a formal appeal from Centenary College to do so was honored.

NBA career

Golden State Warriors (1976–1980) 
After college, Parish was drafted in the first round of the 1976 NBA draft by the Golden State Warriors. He had also been drafted by the Utah Stars in the 1973 ABA Special Circumstances draft and by the Spurs in the 1975 ABA draft. Parish signed with the Warriors. The Warriors were NBA champions in 1975 (two seasons prior to Parish's rookie campaign). However, when Parish joined the Warriors, their decline had begun, and they missed the playoffs completely from 1978 to 1980.

"I was seriously thinking about having a very short basketball career before the trade because of all the losing that I experienced with the Warriors, and being blamed for the Warriors demise." Parish said of his time with Golden State. "I understand that because I was the No. 1 player taken (by the team in the 1976 draft) and the blame falls on my shoulders. But basketball is not an individual sport. It's a team sport. And I just feel like the team was an assembly of misfits and too much independent thinking. Guys were thinking about themselves as opposed to the team."

Early in his career, Parish listed Mike Mitchell, Jamaal Wilkes and Bill Laimbeer as some of the NBA's "silent killers", that is, players whose contributions often cannot be measured by statistics.

In 307 games over four seasons, Parish averaged 13.8 points, 9.5 rebounds and 1.8 blocks with the Warriors.

Boston Celtics (1980–1994) 

Heading into the 1980 NBA draft, the Boston Celtics lost Dave Cowens to retirement and had Larry Bird ready to start his second NBA season. The Celtics held the number-one overall pick in the draft.

On June 9, 1980, in a pre-draft trade, Celtics president Red Auerbach dealt the top overall pick and an additional first-round pick to the Warriors for Parish and the Warriors' first-round pick, the third overall. With that pick, the Celtics chose Kevin McHale. The Warriors then selected Joe Barry Carroll with the first pick.

Reflecting on the trade after his retirement, Parish said, "I was surprised initially. But once I hung up from the Warriors after they called me and told me I was being traded to the Boston Celtics, I cheered and I jumped up and down ... because I went from the (penitentiary) to the penthouse, in my opinion. ... That was what was so rewarding about being with the Celtics because they were all about team. You play for the name on the front of the jersey, not the name on the back of the jersey. So it was refreshing for me because that's my mentality, with the players I was playing with (in Golden State), I could not get them to understand the benefits and the rewards of playing together. They didn't get it for whatever reason. Being traded to the Celtics changed the trajectory of my career."

Completing the trade gave the Celtics an imposing front court consisting of Bird, Parish, Cedric Maxwell and McHale. Playing 14 years with the Celtics from 1980 to 1994, Parish won three NBA titles (1981, 1984 and 1986), teaming with Bird and power forward McHale. The trio came to be known as "The Big Three", and are regarded as one of the greatest front courts in NBA history; all three were named to the NBA's 50th Anniversary All-Time Team.

Parish is the Celtics' all-time leader in blocked shots (1,703), offensive rebounds (3,450), and defensive rebounds (7,601). Bill Russell remains the team's career leader in total rebounds, as offensive and defensive rebounds were not tabulated separately prior to the 1973–1974 season.

In 14 seasons and 1106 games with the Celtics, Parish averaged a double-double of 16.5 points, 10.0 rebounds and 1.5 blocks, shooting 55.2% from the floor.

Charlotte Hornets (1994–1996) 
August 4, 1994, Parish left the Celtics and signed as an unrestricted free agent with the Charlotte Hornets, at age 41.

Parish played two seasons with the Hornets, playing as a backup to Alonzo Mourning.

Chicago Bulls (1996–1997) 
On September 25, 1996, Parish signed as a free agent with the Chicago Bulls after his release from Charlotte. With Chicago, Parish joined a team coming off a fourth championship with fellow Hall of Famers Michael Jordan, Scottie Pippen, and Dennis Rodman.

Playing his final NBA season with the Chicago Bulls in 1996–97, he won his fourth NBA title as a third-string center behind Luc Longley, Bill Wennington, and late-season addition Brian Williams. At 43, he is the third-oldest player to ever play an NBA game, behind Nat Hickey of the Providence Steamrollers, and Kevin Willis of the Dallas Mavericks. On August 25, 1997, Parish officially retired.

Career totals 
As of 2019, Parish was first on the list of National Basketball Association career games played leaders with 1,611 career games played. As of 2019, he also remains the oldest player to win an NBA championship. Overall, in 1611 NBA games he averaged 14.5 points, 9.1 rebounds, and 1.5 blocks, shooting 53.7%. In 184 career playoff games, Parish averaged 15.3 points, 9.6 rebounds, and 1.7 blocks, shooting 50.6%.

Parish ranks sixth in career defensive rebounds (10,117), and fourth in playoff offensive rebounds (571). Of his six career three-point attempts, all of them were misses.

Legacy 
He was known as a versatile center, using his 7' size and speed to contain opposing players, launch precise shots from outside the paint, and finish fast breaks – the latter uncanny for a man of his stature. Fellow Hall-of-Famer and teammate from 1985 to 1987 Bill Walton once called Parish the "greatest shooting big man of all time", perhaps because of Parish's field goal and free throw shooting ability, an unusual talent among most centers. His trademark was his high-release jump shot, which traversed a very high arc before falling.

"There was no showmanship to Robert's game," said Walton. "There was the rebounding. There was the defense. There was the scoring. There was the setting of screens. There was the way he ran the floor. How many centers in today's NBA do any of that?".

In 1996, Parish, along with teammates Larry Bird, Kevin McHale, Nate Archibald, and Bill Walton, was selected as one of the 50 Greatest Players in NBA History. In 1998, the Celtics retired Parish's famous #00 jersey number at halftime of a Celtics–Pacers game; this allowed Bird, then head coach of the Pacers, to participate in the ceremony. In October 2021, Parish was again honored as one of the league’s greatest players of all-time by being named to the NBA 75th Anniversary Team. To commemorate the NBA's 75th Anniversary The Athletic ranked their top 75 players of all time, and named Parish as the 74th greatest player in NBA history.

"He was there for every practice," McHale said of Parish. "For every game. He very seldom missed anything, including assignments on the floor. His longevity is unbelievable, but his dependability was just as impressive."

Parish remains active as a Celtics team consultant and mentor for current Celtics big men. “I have never been one to seek or want attention or admiration or a pat on the back for what I’ve done,” Parish said. “I did my job. I got paid for doing my job. That was enough for me. That’s one of the reasons I was able to accept a lesser role on those teams in the ’80s. I didn’t have a huge ego.”

Coaching career 
In 2001, Parish served as the head coach of the Maryland Mustangs, an expansion team in the United States Basketball League (USBL). Parish coached the team to a USBL Northern Division best 19 wins and 11 losses (.633 win percentage). They lost the quarterfinal playoff game against the Dodge City Legend, 106 to 109. He was named the USBL Coach of the Year but the Mustangs folded after one season.

Unlike his Celtics teammates Larry Bird, Danny Ainge, and Kevin McHale, Parish has not been successful in attaining a coaching, executive, or commentary position in the NBA despite making attempts. McHale, who served as the general manager of the Minnesota Timberwolves, said he tried to hire Parish shortly before his departure from the team but was unable due to a lack of positions. Parish considers himself a potential NBA coach and describes his final three years of his playing career as essentially coaching roles.

Personal life 
During his career, Parish is alleged to have incorporated martial arts, yoga, and vegetarianism into his training and conditioning. In a 2022 interview, Parish stated he was never a vegetarian as he eats chicken and fish but does avoid red meat.

Playing awards 
 Nine-time NBA All-Star with the Boston Celtics.
 All-NBA Second Team in 1981–82.
 All-NBA Third Team in 1988–89.
 4x NBA Championships: Boston Celtics in 1981, 1984, and 1986 and Chicago Bulls in 1997.
 NBA record for the most games played with 1,611 over a 21-year NBA career.

Honors 

 In 1982, Parish was inducted into the Louisiana Basketball Hall of Fame.
 In 1996, Parish was named to the NBA 50th Anniversary Team.
Parish was inducted into the Naismith Basketball Hall of Fame in 2003.
 Number 00 was retired by the Boston Celtics in 1998.
 Parish was inducted into the Centenary College Athletics Hall of Fame in 1988.
 In 2001, Parish was inducted into the Louisiana Sports Hall of Fame.
 Parish was inducted into the College Basketball Hall of Fame in 2006.
 In 2021, Parish was named to the NBA 75th Anniversary Team.

NBA career statistics

Regular season 

|-
| style="text-align:left;"| 
| style="text-align:left;"| Golden State
| 77 || 1 || 18.0 || .503 || -|| .708 || 7.1 || 1.0 || 0.7 || 1.2 || 9.1
|-
| style="text-align:left;"| 
| style="text-align:left;"| Golden State
| 82 || 37 || 24.0 || .472 || - || .625 || 8.3 || 1.2 || 1.0 || 1.5 || 12.5
|-
| style="text-align:left;"| 
| style="text-align:left;"| Golden State
| 76 || 75 || 31.7 || .499 || - || .698 || 12.1 || 1.5 || 1.3 || 2.9 || 17.2
|-
| style="text-align:left;"| 
| style="text-align:left;"| Golden State
| 72 || 69 || 29.4 || .507 || .000 || .715 || 10.9 || 1.7 || 0.8 || 1.6 || 17.0
|-
|  style="text-align:left; background:#afe6ba;"| †
| style="text-align:left;"| Boston
| 82 || 78 || 28.0 || .545 || .000 || .710 || 9.5 || 1.8 || 1.0 || 2.6 || 18.9
|-
| style="text-align:left;"| 
| style="text-align:left;"| Boston
| 80 || 78 || 31.7 || .542 || .000 || .710 || 10.8 || 1.8 || 0.8 || 2.4 || 19.9
|-
| style="text-align:left;"| 
| style="text-align:left;"| Boston
| 78 || 76 || 31.5 || .550 || .000 || .698 || 10.6 || 1.8 || 1.0 || 1.9 || 19.3
|-
|  style="text-align:left; background:#afe6ba;"| †
| style="text-align:left;"| Boston
| 80 || 79 || 35.8 || .546 || .000 || .745 || 10.7 || 1.7 || 0.7 || 1.5 || 19.0
|-
| style="text-align:left;"| 
| style="text-align:left;"| Boston
| 79 || 78 || 36.1 || .542 || .000 || .743 || 10.6 || 1.6 || 0.7 || 1.3 || 17.6
|-
|  style="text-align:left; background:#afe6ba;"| †
| style="text-align:left;"| Boston
| 81 || 80 || 31.7 || .549 || .000 || .731 || 9.5 || 1.8 || 0.8 || 1.4 || 16.1
|-
| style="text-align:left;"| 
| style="text-align:left;"| Boston
| 80 || 80 || 37.4 || .556 || .000 || .735 || 10.6 || 2.2 || 0.8 || 1.8 || 17.5
|-
| style="text-align:left;"| 
| style="text-align:left;"| Boston
| 74 || 73 || 31.2 || .589 || .000 || .734 || 8.5 || 1.6 || 0.7 || 1.1 || 14.3
|-
| style="text-align:left;"| 
| style="text-align:left;"| Boston
| 80 || 80 || 35.5 || .570 || .000 || .719 || 12.5 || 2.2 || 1.0 || 1.5 || 18.6
|-
| style="text-align:left;"| 
| style="text-align:left;"| Boston
| 79 || 78 || 30.3 || .580 || .000 || .747 || 10.1 || 1.3 || 0.5 || 0.9 || 15.7
|-
| style="text-align:left;"| 
| style="text-align:left;"| Boston
| 81 || 81 || 30.1 || .598 || .000 || .767 || 10.6 || 0.8 || 0.8 || 1.3 || 14.9
|-
| style="text-align:left;"| 
| style="text-align:left;"| Boston
| 79 || 79 || 28.9 || .535 || .000 || .772 || 8.9 || 0.9 || 0.9 || 1.2 || 14.1
|-
| style="text-align:left;"| 
| style="text-align:left;"| Boston
| 79 || 79 || 27.2 || .535 || .000 || .689 || 9.4 || 0.8 || 0.7 || 1.4 || 12.6
|-
| style="text-align:left;"| 
| style="text-align:left;"| Boston
| 74 || 74 || 26.9 || .491 || .000 || .740 || 7.3 || 1.1 || 0.6 || 1.3 || 11.7
|-
| style="text-align:left;"| 
| style="text-align:left;"| Charlotte
| 81 || 4 || 16.7 || .427 || .000 || .703 || 4.3 || 0.5 || 0.3 || 0.4 || 4.8
|-
| style="text-align:left;"| 
| style="text-align:left;"| Charlotte
| 74 || 34 || 14.7 || .498 || .000 || .704 || 4.1 || 0.4 || 0.3 || 0.7 || 3.9
|-
|  style="text-align:left; background:#afe6ba;"| †
| style="text-align:left;"| Chicago
| 43 || 3 || 9.4 || .490 || .000 || .677 || 2.1 || 0.5 || 0.1 || 0.4 || 3.7
|- class="sortbottom"
| style="text-align:center;" colspan="2"| Career
|bgcolor="EOCEF2" |  1,611 || 1,320 || 28.4 || .537 || .000 || .721 || 9.1 || 1.4 || 0.8 || 1.5 || 14.5
|- class="sortbottom"
| style="text-align:center;" colspan="2"| All-Star
| 9 || 1 || 15.8 || .529 || – || .667 || 5.9 || 0.9 || 0.4 || 0.9 || 9.6

Playoffs 

|-
| style="text-align:left;"| 1977
| style="text-align:left;"| Golden State
| 10 || 0 || 23.9 || .481 || - || .654 || 10.3 || 1.1 || 0.7 || 1.1 || 12.1
|-
|  style="text-align:left; background:#afe6ba;"| 1981†
| style="text-align:left;"| Boston
| 17 || 17 || 28.9 || .493 || .000 || .672 || 8.6 || 1.1 || 1.2 || 2.3 || 15.0
|-
| style="text-align:left;"| 1982
| style="text-align:left;"| Boston
| 12 || 12 || 35.5 || .488 || .000 || .680 || 11.3 || 1.5 || 0.4 || 4.0 || 21.3
|-
| style="text-align:left;"| 1983
| style="text-align:left;"| Boston
| 7 || 7 || 35.6 || .483 || .000 || .850 || 10.6 || 1.3 || 0.7 || 1.3 || 14.7
|-
|  style="text-align:left; background:#afe6ba;"| 1984†
| style="text-align:left;"| Boston
| 23 || 23 || 37.8 || .478 || .000 || .646 || 10.8 || 1.2 || 1.0 || 1.8 || 14.9
|-
| style="text-align:left;"| 1985
| style="text-align:left;"| Boston
| 21 || 21 || 38.2 || .493 || .000 || .784 || 10.4 || 1.5 || 1.0 || 1.6 || 17.1
|-
|  style="text-align:left; background:#afe6ba;"| 1986†
| style="text-align:left;"| Boston
| 18 || 18 || 32.8 || .471 || .000 || .652 || 8.8 || 1.4 || 0.5 || 1.7 || 15.0
|-
| style="text-align:left;"| 1987
| style="text-align:left;"| Boston
| 21 || 21 || 35.0 || .567 || .000 || .767 || 9.4 || 1.3 || 0.9 || 1.7 || 18.0
|-
| style="text-align:left;"| 1988
| style="text-align:left;"| Boston
| 17 || 17 || 36.8 || .532 || .000 || .820 || 9.9 || 1.2 || 0.6 || 1.1 || 14.7
|-
| style="text-align:left;"| 1989
| style="text-align:left;"| Boston
| 3 || 3 || 37.3 || .455 || .000 || .778 || 8.7 || 2.0 || 1.3 || 0.7 || 15.7
|-
| style="text-align:left;"| 1990
| style="text-align:left;"| Boston
| 5 || 5 || 34.0 || .574 || .000 || .944 || 10.0 || 2.6 || 1.0 || 1.4 || 15.8
|-
| style="text-align:left;"| 1991
| style="text-align:left;"| Boston
| 10 || 10 || 29.6 || .598 || .000 || .689 || 9.2 || 0.6 || 0.8 || 0.7 || 15.8
|-
| style="text-align:left;"| 1992
| style="text-align:left;"| Boston
| 10 || 10 || 33.5 || .495 || .000 || .714 || 9.7 || 1.4 || 0.7 || 1.5 || 12.0
|-
| style="text-align:left;"| 1993
| style="text-align:left;"| Boston
| 4 || 4 || 36.5 || .544 || .000 || .857 || 9.5 || 1.3 || 0.2 || 1.5 || 17.0
|-
| style="text-align:left;"| 1995
| style="text-align:left;"| Charlotte
| 4 || 0 || 17.8 || .545 || .000 || .400 || 2.3 || 0.3 || 0.0 || 0.8 || 3.5
|-
|  style="text-align:left; background:#afe6ba;"| 1997†
| style="text-align:left;"| Chicago
| 2 || 0 || 9.0 || .143 || .000 || .000 || 2.0 || 0.0 || 0.0 || 1.5 || 1.0
|- class="sortbottom"
| style="text-align:center;" colspan="2"| Career
| 184 || 168 || 33.6 || .506 || .000 || .722 || 9.6 || 1.3 || 0.8 || 1.7 || 15.3

See also 
 List of National Basketball Association career games played leaders
 List of National Basketball Association career scoring leaders
 List of National Basketball Association career rebounding leaders
 List of National Basketball Association career blocks leaders
 List of National Basketball Association career turnovers leaders
 List of National Basketball Association career minutes played leaders
 List of National Basketball Association career playoff rebounding leaders
 List of National Basketball Association career playoff blocks leaders
 List of National Basketball Association career playoff turnovers leaders
 List of National Basketball Association players with most rebounds in a game
 List of National Basketball Association players with most blocks in a game
 List of National Basketball Association seasons played leaders

References

External links 

Robert Parish NBA Legends Bio
 NBA biography (archived from 1997)
 

Where Are They Now?: Robert Parish @ NBA.com

1953 births
Living people
20th-century African-American sportspeople
21st-century African-American people
African-American basketball players
All-American college men's basketball players
American men's basketball players
Basketball players at the 1975 Pan American Games
Basketball players from Shreveport, Louisiana
Boston Celtics players
Centenary Gentlemen basketball players
Centers (basketball)
Charlotte Hornets players
Chicago Bulls players
Golden State Warriors draft picks
Golden State Warriors players
Medalists at the 1975 Pan American Games
Naismith Memorial Basketball Hall of Fame inductees
National Basketball Association All-Stars
National Basketball Association players with retired numbers
NCAA sanctions
Pan American Games gold medalists for the United States
Pan American Games medalists in basketball
Parade High School All-Americans (boys' basketball)
San Antonio Spurs draft picks
United States Basketball League coaches
Utah Stars draft picks